Denisovka may refer to:
Denisovka, Kazakhstan, a settlement in Kostanay Region of Kazakhstan
Denisovka, Russia, name of several rural localities in Russia
the former name of Birdik, Ysyk-Ata, a village in Chuy Region of Kyrgyzstan